Béré is a town in the Tandjilé Region, Chad. It is known for its weekly market on Saturdays. The economy is agricultural-based, producing rice, sorghum, peanuts, sesame and cotton.

Population
Population by years:

Notable people
Kaar Kaas Sonn (1973-), musician

References

Populated places in Chad